Aleksandar Gec (3 March 1928 – 12 April 2008) was a Serbian professional basketball player, coach and administrator. He was the first basketball star of Crvena zvezda. He represented the Yugoslavia national basketball team internationally.

Early life 
Gec spent his whole lifetime in Belgrade, where he finished his education. He went to the Third Men's Gymnasium.

Playing career

Crvena zvezda 
Gec began playing basketball for Crvena zvezda team in 1945, practically since its foundation. With Crvena zvezda he has won the eight Yugoslav National Championships in a row from 1945 until 1953. In July 1950, he was a member of the Zvezda squad that won an international cup tournament in Milan, Italy.

In the 1952 Championship Gec averaged 8.5 points per game (110 points in 13 matches). He is known for game against Proleter Zrenjanin in 1952. Four seconds before the end of the game, the score was tied when he took responsibility and scored with a shot from half court, but the crowd formed at the scorer's table and the judges ruled to overturn the point and then return the ball to his team. Gec scored winning point from the same place.

After three games in the 1953 Championship Gec felt very bad. Doctors discovered serious illness of the left lung and because of that he finished his playing career with just 25.

Yugoslavia national team 
As a player for the Yugoslavia national basketball team Gec participated in 1950 World Championship and two European Championship, 1947 in Prague and 1953 in Moscow.

Coaching career 
Gec become a head coach of Crvena zvezda in 1956 where he replaced Nebojša Popović on that position. After 1959 Yugoslav League season Gec left the job. He also coached the Yugoslavia women's national team at 1956 European Women's Basketball Championship in  Prague, Czechoslovakia.

Administrative career 
Gec was President of Crvena zvezda during the 1970s when they won two National Championship, three Yugoslav Cups and the FIBA European Cup Winner's Cup in 1974.

After an Eternal derby in which Partizan won, Partizan fans beat up the few Red Star fans in front of the police who did not intervene. Gec is required to send a protest letter to the Director of Partizan, which was also the Minister of the Interior of Serbia. Gec's Associates declined because of fear, whereupon Gec submitted the irrevocable resignation.

In popular culture 
 In 2015 Serbian sports drama We Will Be the World Champions Gec is portrayed by Stevan Piale.

Coaching record

Yugoslav First Basketball League

See also 
 List of Red Star Belgrade basketball coaches

References

1928 births
2008 deaths
1950 FIBA World Championship players
Basketball players from Belgrade
Burials at Belgrade New Cemetery
Guards (basketball)
Yugoslav men's basketball players
Yugoslav basketball coaches
Serbian men's basketball players
Serbian men's basketball coaches
KK Crvena zvezda players
KK Crvena zvezda head coaches
KK Crvena Zvezda executives
Serbian basketball executives and administrators